NACF may refer to:

 National Agricultural Cooperative Federation
 National Art Collections Fund
 National Association of Catholic Families